The 1954 Yale Bulldogs football team represented Yale University in the 1954 college football season.  The Bulldogs were led by third-year head coach Jordan Olivar, played their home games at the Yale Bowl and finished the season with a 5–3–1 record.

Schedule

References

Yale
Yale Bulldogs football seasons
Yale Bulldogs football